Thomas Berkeley (1575–1611), was an English MP.

Thomas Berkeley may also refer to:

Thomas Berkeley (1351–1405), English MP for Gloucestershire, 1380 and 1390
Thomas Berkeley (died 1488), English MP for Leicestershire, 1472-75
Thomas Berkeley, 5th Baron Berkeley (1472–1532), Baron Berkeley
Thomas Berkeley, 6th Baron Berkeley (1505–1534), Baron Berkeley

See also
Thomas de Berkeley (disambiguation)